Plockton High School is a 300-pupil high school in the village of Plockton, Scotland.  The catchment area for the school stretches from Applecross in the north to Corran in the south. Since the opening of the Skye Bridge, increasing numbers of pupils from South Skye, who would have traditionally gone to Portree High School, have instead attended Plockton High School.  The school has a small hostel to cater for pupils who live far away.

Sgoil Chiùil na Gàidhealtachd
Since its inauguration in 2000, Sgoil Chiùil na Gàidhealtachd (National Centre of Excellence in Traditional Music) has been located at the High School and is a music school. Any secondary school age pupil in Scotland can apply, and students from all over Scotland attend, most of whom stay in the school's hostel.

Notable former pupils

 John Farquhar Munro, MSP, 1950s. 
 Rhoda Grant, MSP

Notable staff
 Sorley MacLean, Rector of the school from 1956 until 1972.

External links
 Case study

Secondary schools in Highland (council area)
Plockton
Scottish folk music
Scottish Gaelic-language secondary schools